Pedro Antonio Sánchez López (born January 30, 1976 Puerto Lumbreras) is a Spanish politician  and member of the right People's Party (PP) political party in the southern Region of Murcia. He has served as the 6th democratically elected President of the Region of Murcia since July 3, 2015, following the PP's victory in the May 2015 Murcian parliamentary election.

Sánchez's PP retained a majority in the Regional Assembly of Murcia, but lost eleven seats compared to 2011. Sanchez was elected President of Murcia with the support of the 22 PP members in the Regional Assembly, as well as four members of Ciudadanos party.

Sánchez was sworn in as President on Friday evening, July 3, 2015, at a ceremony at the Palacio de San Esteban. His government was seated on Sunday, July 5, 2015.

On February 20, 2017, he was called to testify on March 6 in a case of corruption as an accused. On April 3, he was accused by the judge Eloy Velasco of participating in the case known as Trama Púnica (in Spanish), which led to his resignation as President of Murcia on the following day, one day before the scheduled vote of no confidence in the Regional Assembly.

References

1976 births
Presidents of the Region of Murcia
Members of the Regional Assembly of Murcia
Mayors of places in the Region of Murcia
People's Party (Spain) politicians
University of Granada alumni
People from Puerto Lumbreras
Living people